Richard Barton (1790–1866) was the first European resident of Trentham, Upper Hutt, in New Zealand.

Richard Barton may also refer to:
Richard John Barton (1879–1931), New Zealand runholder, pastoralist and author
Rich Barton (born 1967), American internet entrepreneur
Richard W. Barton (1800–1859), Virginia politician and lawyer
Richard Bradshaigh (1601–1669), aka Richard Barton, Jesuit
Dick Barton, BBC radio programme between 1946 and 1951
Dick Barton (boxer) (1911–1990), South African boxer

See also
Rick Barton (disambiguation)